Kōichi, Koichi, Kouichi or Kohichi is a masculine Japanese given name.

Possible writings
Kōichi can be written using different kanji characters and can mean:
晃一, "clear, one"
幸一, "happiness, one"
光一, "light, one"
孝一, "filial piety, one"
弘一, "vast, one"
浩一, "abundance, one"
宏一, "wide, one"
耕一, "cultivate, one"
孝市, "filial piety, market"
The name can also be written in hiragana (こういち) or katakana (コウイチ).

People with the name
, Japanese baseball player
 Koichi Chigira (孝一, born 1959), Japanese anime director
 Koichi Domoto (born 1979), Japanese performing artist
 Kōichi Fukaura, Japanese shogi player
 Koichi Fukuda (born 1975), Japanese musician
Koichi Iida ((飯田 鴻一, 1888–1973), Japanese businessman
, Japanese golfer
 Koichi Ishii (浩一, born 1964), Japanese game designer
 Koichi Kato (LDP) (born 1939), Japanese politician
 Koichi Kato (DPJ) (born 1964), Japanese politician
 Koichi Kawakita (born 1942), Japanese special effects artist
 Kōichi Kido (1889–1977), Lord Keeper of the Privy Seal of Japan during World War II
, Japanese shogi player
 Kōichi Kitamura (1931–2007), Japanese voice actor
 Kōichi Mashimo (born 1952), Japanese anime director
, Japanese rower
 Koichi Mizushima (born 1965), Japanese gymnast
, Japanese long-distance runner
 Koichi Morita (army officer)
 Koichi Morita (songwriter)
, Japanese footballer
, Japanese video game designer
, former professional racing cyclist and ten-consecutive-time world champion in track cycling sprint
 Koichi Nishimura (born 1973), Japanese volleyball player
Koichi Omura (大村 皓一, born 1938), Japanese computer animator
, Japanese golfer
 Kōichi Sakaguchi (坂口　候一, born 1968), Japanese voice actor
, Japanese actor
, Japanese biathlete
, Japanese footballer
, Japanese philatelist
, Japanese ski jumper
, Japanese murderer
, Japanese bobsledder
 Koichi Sugiyama (こういち; birth name 浩一, born 1931), Japanese video game composer
, Japanese baseball player and manager
 Koichi Tanaka (born 1959), Japanese Nobel Prize winner in chemistry
, Japanese footballer and manager
 Koichi Tohei (born 1920), Japanese aikido practitioner
 Kōichi Tokita (born 1961), Japanese manga artist
 Kōichi Tōchika (born 1971), Japanese voice actor
 Koichi Wakata (born 1963), Japanese astronaut
 Kōichi Yamadera (born 1961), Japanese voice actor
 Koichi Kobayashi (born 1952), Japanese Go player
 Koichi Morishita (born 1967), Japanese long-distance runner
, Japanese sumo wrestler

Fictional characters
 Kouichi Kimura, from the TV series Digimon Frontier
 Koichi Shido, from manga/anime Highschool of the Dead
 Kouichi Hayase, from manga/anime Linebarrels of Iron
 Koichi Zenigata, from Lupin III
 Koichi Hayama, from adult anime/game Moonlight Lady
 Koichi Hiramoto, from Wangan Midnight
 Koichi Kijima, from Wangan Midnight
 Kōichi Tanemura, a character from the anime/manga Hanasaku Iroha
 Kōichi Sakakibara, the main protagonist of the series Another
 Koichi Hirose, a character from the manga JoJo's Bizarre Adventure
 Koichi Kizakura, a character from the anime Danganronpa 3: The End of Hope's Peak High School
 Koichi Haimawari, a character from the manga Boku no Hero Academia
 Koichi Adachi, a character and main party member from the videogame Yakuza: Like a Dragon

Japanese masculine given names